is a Japanese manga series written and illustrated by Makoto Hoshino. It was serialized in Shogakukan's Weekly Shōnen Sunday from August 2019 to April 2021, with its chapters collected in eight tankōbon volumes. The series is licensed for English release in North America by Seven Seas Entertainment. An anime television series adaptation by Ashi Productions premiered in January 2023.

Plot
Wisteria is an orphan girl living in a corner of the British Empire at the end of the 19th century. Her life is desolate and bleak–until she encounters Marbas, a powerful but equally lonely immortal being with a furry appearance, hounded by hunters. Together, Wisteria and Marbas roam the Empire–populated by humans and human-like beasts–in search of a place where they can live together in peace.

Characters
 
 
 A girl who was treated like a slave. She was born with the ability to see demons. She makes a contract with the great demon Marbas, offering her "sight" to him, and goes about her daily life with Marbas as a free woman.
 
 
 A great demon who used to be feared, but now that the number of people who can see demons has decreased, he spends his days bored. He makes a contract with Wisteria, a girl who can see demons, and goes about his daily life with her.
 
 
 The older brother of Wisteria who was separated from her. His love for his sister is very deep. He wears the clothes of a clergyman and belongs to the Knights of the Sword Cross. However, he is somewhat of a delinquent.
 
 
 A captain of the Knights of the Sword Cross and Snow's colleague. He wields a Japanese sword.
 
 
 The only daughter of the Earl Blackbell family. A young lady of noble birth. She has made a contract with the great demon Naberius. She also has a friendly demeanor.
 
 
 A great demon. One of the Thirteen Plagues of the Collapsed Kingdom. He has made a contract with Diana, a young lady of noble birth.
 
 
 The leader of the Knights of the Sword Cross, a demon-slaying organization based in Europe, mainly in England. He always wears armor.
 
 
 A great demon who was counted among the Thirteen Plagues of the Broken Kingdom. She was defeated by the Commander and made a contract with the Knights of the Sword Cross after being tortured.
 
 
 One of the Thirteen Plagues. He has a contract with Luther. In exchange for making Luther fight for his life, he has made a pact with him to restore his lost memories. He wants humans to wage war.
 
 
 A great demon and another of the Thirteen Plagues. He sleeps at the bottom of a lake in the Lake District. Once he sleeps, he doesn't wake up for several hundred years. His words and actions are full of mysteries.
 
 
 A veteran of the Afghan War who fought alongside Snow. Works with the two pillars of the Thirteen Plagues, Citri and Dantalion. Wants to fight and declares war on the Knights of the Sword Cross.
 　
 
 A military doctor who spent time on the battlefield with Snow and Luther.
 　
 
 London's most famous detective.

Media

Manga
Shogakukan collected its chapters in eight tankōbon volumes, released from November 18, 2019, to May 18, 2021.

On August 28, 2020, Seven Seas Entertainment announced the English language release of the manga starting on June 1, 2021.

A nine-chapter special manga series by Hoshino, subtitled The Flame Knight, was serialized in Shogakukan's Sunday Webry website from January 8 to March 5, 2023. A single volume was published on March 16, 2023.

Volume list

Anime
An anime television series adaptation was announced on June 30, 2022. At Anime Expo 2022, Crunchyroll announced that they licensed the series outside of Asia. At Crunchyroll Expo 2022, Crunchyroll announced that the series would be animated by Ashi Productions and directed by Yasutaka Yamamoto, with Kenichi Yamashita in charge of series composition and writing scripts along with Yamamoto and Sayaka Harada, Mina Ōsawa designing the characters and serving as chief animation supervisor along with Hikaru Suzuki, Kanta Suzuki designing the monsters, and Hiroaki Tsutsumi and Kana Hashiguchi composing the music. It premiered on January 8, 2023, on Tokyo MX and other networks. Ayana Taketatsu performed the opening theme song , while Hakubi performed the ending theme song "Rewrite".

Episode list

Notes

References

External links
  
  
 

2023 anime television series debuts
Anime series based on manga
Ashi Productions
Comics set in the United Kingdom
Crunchyroll anime
Demons in anime and manga
Fiction set in the 19th century
Historical fantasy anime and manga
Seven Seas Entertainment titles
Shogakukan manga
Shōnen manga
Supernatural anime and manga
Tokyo MX original programming